Zike may refer to:

 Zike (company) - makes hybrid scooters
 Zike, Liberia
 the Sinclair Zike bicycle